Sonteh or Santeh or Sanateh may refer to:
 Sonteh, Kerman
 Santeh, Kurdistan
 Sanateh, Mazandaran